Society Mugs is a 1946 Columbia Pictures short film directed by Edward Bernds starring Shemp Howard and Tom Kennedy.

Plot
High society woman Muriel Allen (Christine McIntyre) wants to attend a swanky dinner party thrown by friend Alice Preston (Rebel Randall) but husband Arthur (Charles Williams) decides instead to go on a fishing trip. Rather than showing up stag to the party, Muriel tells housekeeper Petunia (Etta McDaniel) to call the Acme Escort Service to bring a few "college boy" escorts. However, Petunia accidentally calls the Acme Exterminator Co., operated by Shemp and Tom.

At the mansion, the duo are assumed to be cultured old college seniors. Guest of honor Lord Wafflebottom (Vernon Dent) follows the pest exterminators' lead in proper American party manners, turning the dinner party into an uncouth display. When mice are conveniently spotted, the boys go to work, disrupting the party and the entire mansion.

Production notes
Society Mugs is a remake of Termites of 1938 starring The Three Stooges. Bess Flowers, who appears as a dinner guest in this film, appeared as "Muriel Allen" in Termites of 1938, while Etta McDaniel played the maid in both films.

References

External links 

Society Mugs at threestooges.net

1946 films
1946 comedy films
American black-and-white films
Short film remakes
Films directed by Edward Bernds
Columbia Pictures short films
American comedy short films
1940s English-language films
1940s American films